Isodon is a group  of flowering plants in the family Lamiaceae described as a genus in 1840.  It is native to tropical and subtropical parts of the Old World, primarily Asia but two species are from Africa. Many of the species are endemic to China.

Species

References

Lamiaceae
Lamiaceae genera